G. Ernest Arlett  is a member of the Northeastern University athletics Hall of Fame. Arlett was inducted in 1976 for his accomplishments in crew. Arlett also was the United States Olympic coach for Sculling during the 1976 Summer Olympic Games. Arlett also is credited with the creation of the Head of the Charles Regatta, which was organized in 1965.

Northeastern University 
During the 1965 season Arlett helped to lead Northeastern to the Small College Championship. Northeastern then was invited to the IRA Regatta along with the Henley Royal Regatta. During the 1972 and 1973 seasons, Northeastern won the men's heavyweight eight at the Eastern Sprints championships. Both of those seasons also saw NU battled in the finals of the Grand Challenge Cup, where the Huskies ultimately lost.

Coaching 
After graduating Arlett went off to coach crew at Oxford, Harvard, Rutgers, and Northeastern. In 1976, Arlett was named as the 1976 US Olympic men's sculling coach.

References

External links 
 GoNU.com Hall of Fame Profile

Northeastern University alumni
Harvard Crimson rowing coaches